Jiang Hongquan (born 2 January 1987 in Helong, Yanbian) is a Chinese footballer of Korean descent.

Club career
Jiang Hongquan started his professional football career in 2006 when he was promoted to Yanbian FC's first squad. On 5 March 2016, Jiang made his Super League debut in the first match of 2016 season against Shanghai Shenhua.

Career statistics
Statistics accurate as of match played 3 November 2018.

Honours
Yanbian FC
 China League One: 2015

References

External links
 

1987 births
Living people
Chinese footballers
People from Yanbian
Yanbian Funde F.C. players
Chinese Super League players
China League One players
Chinese people of Korean descent
Association football defenders